Uzan-e Olya (also Romanized as Ūzān-e ‘Olyā; also known as Owzān-e Bālā, Ūzān, and Ūzān-e Bālā) is a village in Chaharduli Rural District, Keshavarz District, Shahin Dezh County, West Azerbaijan Province, Iran. At the 2006 census, its population was 48, in 10 families.

References 

Populated places in Shahin Dezh County